Islam in the Dominican Republic is a minority religion. Accurate statistics of religious affiliation are difficult to calculate and there is a wide variation concerning the actual numerical amount. Although the majority of the population is Christian, Muslims have formed local organizations such as the Círculo Islámico de República Dominicana (The Islamic Circle of Dominican Republic) and the Islamic Center of the Dominican Republic (located in Miami). Currently, the Círculo Islámico estimates that Muslims number over 4,000 (most recent statistics), including of a good number of local converts. Most recently, there has been another organization, led by native born Muslim converts, the Entidad Islámica Dominicana or EID (Dominican Islamic Entity).

The Círculo Islámico established the first mosque in the Dominican Republic in the center of Santo Domingo, about a five-minute walk from the Palacio de Policía Nacional and the Universidad Iberoamericana (UNIBE) where Muslims from around the city would have easy access to reach it. They made an agreement with the owner to purchase the land and the building for an amount of 2.85 million pesos. The mosque is open daily for the five prayers (salat) and offers classes on Islamic studies for ladies and children on weekends. They also provide free medical consultation along with a free pharmacy, Consulta Al-Foutory, which is located in a separate building at the back of the mosque. The Al-Noor Mosque is largely believed to be the only active mosque in the country and receives the bulk of the Muslim population for the two Eids, Ramadan, Salat al Jummah, and the five daily prayers. However, there is another mosque in Los Llanos neighborhood of San Pedro de Macorix, Dominican Republic. This mosque is led by a converted Dominican Imam. Los Llanos is roughly a 30 minutes drive from the Al-Noor Mosque. The Musalla Al-Hidayya provides Jummah services in the city of Santiago de los Caballeros, and the Musalah Al-Nabawi( address: Av. Espana Plaza Estrella No. 411, Bavaro Punta Cana )  serves local and visiting Muslims in the tourist sector of Bávaro-Punta Cana in the East of the country.

History

Slavery
Like other countries in the Caribbean and Latin America, the history of Islam in the Dominican Republic began with the importation of African slaves, which first arrived to the island of Hispaniola (Haiti and the Dominican Republic), beginning in 1502. These people arrived with a rich and ancient culture, although brutal repression and forced conversions gradually diluted their original cultural identity and religions. The first recorded instances of resistance were in 1503, when Nicolás de Ovando, Hispaniola's first royal governor, wrote to Isabella requesting that she prevent further shipments to the colony of enslaved Black ladinos, or persons possessing knowledge of Spanish or Portuguese languages and cultures, but who also often had connections to either Senegambia, Islam, or both. De Ovando had arrived earlier in April 1502 and was already complaining that the ladinos on the island were “a source of scandal to the Indians, and some had fled their owners,” establishing maroon communities in the mountains.

Present situation

Muslim population in the nation was increased by Middle Eastern settlers, mostly Arabs of Lebanese, Syrian, Palestinian and by Pakistanis and other people from the Indian subcontinent. 

Brands of Tasawwuf are becoming more and more manifested in the country from native born Dominican Muslims and foreign Muslims who are murids of the Shadhili, Qadiri, and Ba'Alawi Tariqas. The actual figures of the Muslim population growth has not been officially censused, though some sources give a number of 5,000 to 7,000.

Mosques
 Al-Noor Mosque

References

Further reading
Parvez, Mansoor Ahmed Presencia del Islam en la República Dominicana Departamenteo de Estudios de Sociedad y Religión, Santo Domingo

External links
https://web.archive.org/web/20160110185149/http://circuloislamico.com/
http://www.islamicfinder.org

 
Dominican Republic